Krymskoye Urban Settlement is a municipal formation (an urban settlement) in Krymsky Municipal District of Krasnodar Krai, Russia. It is the only urban settlement in the district. Its territory comprises the territory of the Town of Krymsk (an administrative unit with the status equal to that of the districts) and the khutor of Verkhneadagum in Nizhnebakansky Rural Okrug.

References

Notes

Sources

Urban settlements of Russia
Geography of Krasnodar Krai